He Long (March 22, 1896 – June 9, 1969) was a Chinese Communist revolutionary and one of the ten marshals of the People's Liberation Army. He was from a poor rural family in Hunan, and his family was not able to provide him with any formal education. He began his revolutionary career after avenging the death of his uncle, when he fled to become an outlaw and attracted a small personal army around him. Later his forces joined the Kuomintang, and he participated in the Northern Expedition.

He rebelled against the Kuomintang after Chiang Kai-shek began violently suppressing Communists, when he planned and led the unsuccessful Nanchang Uprising. After escaping, he organized a soviet in rural Hunan (and later Guizhou), but was forced to abandon his bases when pressured by Chiang's Encirclement Campaigns. He joined the Long March in 1935, over a year after forces associated with Mao Zedong and Zhu De were forced to do so. He met with forces led by Zhang Guotao, but he disagreed with Zhang about the strategy of the Red Army and led his forces to join and support Mao.

After settling and establishing a headquarters in Shaanxi, He led guerrilla forces in Northwest China in both the Chinese Civil War and the Second Sino-Japanese War, and was generally successful in expanding areas of Communist control. He commanded a force of 170,000 troops forces by the end of 1945, when his force was placed under the command of Peng Dehuai and He became Peng's second-in-command. He was placed in control of Southwest China in the late 1940s, and spent most of the 1950s in the Southwest administering the region in both civilian and military roles.

He held a number of civilian and military positions after the founding of the People's Republic of China in 1949. In 1955, He's contributions to the victory of the Communist Party in China were recognized when he was named one of the Ten Marshals, and he served as China's vice premier. He did not support Mao Zedong's attempts to purge Peng Dehuai in 1959 and attempted to rehabilitate Peng. After the Cultural Revolution was declared in 1966, he was one of the first leaders of the PLA to be purged. He died in 1969 when a glucose injection provided by his jailers complicated his untreated diabetes.

Biography

Early life

He Long was a member of the Tujia ethnic group. Born in the Sangzhi, Hunan, he and his siblings, including He Ying, grew up in a poor peasant household, despite his father being a minor Qing military officer. His father was a member of the Gelaohui (Elder Brother Society), a secret society dating back to the early Qing dynasty. A cowherd during his youth, he received no formal education. When He was 20 he killed a local government tax assessor who had killed his uncle for defaulting on his taxes. He then fled and became an outlaw, giving rise to the legend that he began his revolutionary career with just two kitchen knives. After beginning his life as an outlaw he gained a reputation as a "Robin Hood-like figure". His signature weapon was a butcher knife.

Around 1918 He raised a volunteer revolutionary army that was aligned with a local Hunan warlord, and in 1920, his personal army joined the National Revolutionary Army. In 1923 He was promoted to command the Nationalist Twentieth Army. In 1925 He ran a school for training Kuomintang soldiers. While running this school, He became close with some of his students who were also Communist Party members. During the 1926 Northern Expedition, He commanded the 1st Division, 9th Corps of the National Revolutionary Army. He served under Zhang Fakui during the Northern Expedition.

In late 1926 He joined the Chinese Communist Party (CCP). In 1927, after the collapse of Wang Jingwei's leftist Kuomintang government in Wuhan and Chiang Kai-shek's suppression of communists, He left the Kuomintang and joined the Communists, commanding the 20th Corps, 1st Column of the Red Army. He and Zhu De planned and led the main force of the Nanchang Uprising in 1927. In the Nanchang Uprising He and Zhu led a combined force of 24,000 men and attempted to seize the city of Nanchang, but they were not able to secure it against the inevitable Kuomintang attempt to retake the city. The campaign suffered from logistical difficulties, and the communists suffered 50% casualties in the two months of fighting. Most of He's soldiers who survived surrendered, deserted, and/or rejoined the KMT. Only 2,000 survivors eventually returned to fight for the Communists in 1928, when Zhu reformed his forces in Hunan.

After his forces were defeated, He fled to Lufeng, Guangdong. He spent some time in Hong Kong, but was later sent by the Party to Shanghai, then to Wuhan. Chiang Kai-shek continuously tried to persuade him rejoin the Kuomintang, but failed.

Communist guerrilla
After the failure of the Nanchang Uprising, He turned down an offer by the CCP Central Committee to study in Russia and returned to Hunan, where he raised a new force in 1930. His force controlled a broad area of the countryside in the Hunan-Hubei border region, around the area of Lake Hong, and organized this area into a rural soviet. In mid-1932 Kuomintang forces targeted He's soviet as part of the Fourth Encirclement Campaign. He's forces abandoned their bases, moved southwest, and established a new base in northeast Guizhou in mid-1933.

In 1934 Ren Bishi joined He in Guizhou with his own surviving forces after also being forced to abandon his soviet in another Encirclement Campaign. Ren and He merged forces, with He becoming the military commander and Ren becoming the commissar. He joined the Long March in November 1935, over a year after forces led by Zhu De and Mao Zedong were forced to evacuate their own soviet in Jiangxi. He's ability to resist the Kuomintang was partially due to his position on the periphery of Communist-controlled territory. While on the Long March He's forces met Communist forces led by Zhang Guotao in June 1936, but both He and Ren disagreed with Zhang about the direction of the Long March, and He eventually led his forces into Shaanxi to join Mao Zedong by the end of 1936. In 1937 He settled his troops in northwestern Shaanxi and established a new headquarters there. Because the Second Army of the Chinese Red Army under He Long's command was one of the few Communist forces to arrive in Yan'an mostly intact, his force was able to assume the responsibility of protecting the new capital after their arrival.

When the Red Army was reorganized into the Eighth Route Army in 1937, He was placed in command of the 120th Division. From late 1938 to 1940 He fought both the Japanese army and Kuomintang-affiliated guerrillas in Hubei. He's responsibilities increased during the Second Sino-Japanese War, and in 1943 he was promoted to be the overall commander of Communist forces in Shanxi, Shaanxi, Gansu, Ningxia, and Inner Mongolia. By the end of World War II He commanded a force of approximately 175,000 troops across northwestern China. He's most notable subordinates included Zhang Zongxun, Xu Guangda, and Peng Shaohui.

He was successful in expanding Communist base areas throughout the period of World War II. Part of He's success was due to the social confusion caused by Japan's Ichi-Go offensive in the areas of China that Japanese operations effected. He was frequently able to expand Communist areas of operation by allying with local, independent guerrilla forces who were also fighting the Japanese. He's experience fighting the Kuomintang and the Japanese led him to question Mao's unconditional emphasis on the importance of ideological guerrilla warfare at the expense of conventional tactics and military organization.

In October 1945, one month after the Japanese surrender, the command of He's forces was transferred to Peng Dehuai, which operated as the "Northwest Field Army". He became Peng's second-in-command, but spent most of the rest of the Chinese Civil War in central Party headquarters, in and around Yan'an. After the Japanese surrender, in 1945, He was elected to the Central Committee, and his influence rose within both the military and the communist political system. Near the end of the Chinese Civil War He was promoted to command the First Field Army, which was active in Southwest China. After the Communists won the civil war in 1949, He spent most of the 1950s in both civilian and military roles in the southwest.

In the People's Republic
He's military accomplishments were recognized when he was promoted to being one of the Ten Marshals in 1955, and he served in a number of civilian positions. He was made Vice Premier, and he headed the National Sports Commission. He was one of the most well-traveled members of the Communist Party elite, and led numerous delegations abroad, meeting with leaders of other Asian countries, the Soviet Union, and East Germany.

After Mao Zedong purged Peng Dehuai in 1959, Mao appointed He to the head of an office to investigate Peng's past and find reasons to criticize Peng. He accepted the position but was sympathetic to Peng, and stalled for over a year before submitting his report. Mao's prestige weakened when it became widely known that Mao's Great Leap Forward had been a disaster, and He eventually presented a report that was positive, and which attempted to vindicate Peng. Peng was partially rehabilitated in 1965, but then purged again at the beginning of the Cultural Revolution 1966.

Jiang Qing denounced He in December 1966 of being a "rightist" and of intra-Party factionalism. Following Jiang's accusations He and his supporters were branded an anti-Party element and quickly purged. He's persecutors singled him out by labeling him the "biggest bandit". He was the second highest-ranking member of the Military Affairs Commission at the time that he was purged, and the method in which he and those close to him were purged set the pattern for multiple later purges of the PLA leadership throughout the Cultural Revolution.

After being purged, He was placed under indefinite house arrest for the last two and a half years of his life. He described the conditions of his imprisonment as a period of slow torture, in which his captors "intended to destroy my health so that they can murder me without spilling my blood". During the years that he was imprisoned, his captors restricted his access to water, cut off his house's heat during the winter, and refused him access to medicine to treat his diabetes. He died in 1969 after being hospitalized for the severe malnutrition that he developed while under house arrest. He died soon after being admitted to hospital, after a glucose injection complicated his chronic diabetes.

He was posthumously rehabilitated after Deng Xiaoping came to power in the late 1970s. A stadium in Changsha was named after him in 1987.

See also
List of officers of the People's Liberation Army

References

Citations

Sources 

 The Cambridge History of China. Vol 15: "The People's Republic". Part 2: "Revolutions". Eds. Roderick MacFarquhar & John K. Fairbank. Cambridge: Cambridge University Press. 1991. .
 "Intelligence Report: Mao's 'Cultural Revolution' III. The Purge of the P.L.A. and the Stardom of Madame Mao". Central Intelligence Agency. June 1968. Retrieved May 27, 2012.
 China at War: An Encyclopedia. Ed. Li Xiaobing. United States of America: ABC-CLIO. 2012. . Retrieved May 21, 2012.
 Chung, Jang. White Swans: Three Daughters of China.  New York, NY: Touchstone. 2003. .
 Domes, Jurgen. Peng Te-huai: The Man and the Image. London: C. Hurst & Company. 1985. .
 Rice, Edward E. Mao's Way. Berkeley: University of California Press. 1974. .
 Leung, Edward Pak-wah. Historical Dictionary of the Chinese Civil War. United States of America: Scarecrow Press. 2002. .
 Lew, Christopher R. The Third Chinese Revolutionary War, 1945-1949: An Analysis of Communist Strategy and Leadership. The USA and Canada: Routelage. 2009. 
 Whitson, William W., & Huang Chen-hsia. The Chinese High Command: A History of Communist Military Politics, 1927-71. New York: Praeger Publishers. 1973.
 Winchester, Simon. "China's Ancient Skyline". The New York Times. July 5, 2007. Retrieved May 21, 2012.

1896 births
1969 deaths
Marshals of the People's Republic of China
Chinese Communist Party politicians from Hunan
Politicians from Zhangjiajie
Eighth Route Army generals
Tax resisters
People persecuted to death during the Cultural Revolution
People's Republic of China politicians from Hunan
Members of the 8th Politburo of the Chinese Communist Party